Syed Ashiq Hussain Bukhari is a Pakistani politician who had been a member of the National Assembly of Pakistan from 2008 to 2014.

Political career
Bukhari was elected to the National Assembly of Pakistan as a candidate of Pakistan Muslim League (Q) (PML-Q) from Constituency NA-153 (Multan-VI) in 2008 Pakistani general election. He received 69,246 votes and defeated Rana Muhammad Qasim Noon.

He was re-elected to the National Assembly as a candidate of Pakistan Muslim League (N) (PML-N) from Constituency NA-153 (Multan-IV) in 2013 Pakistani general election. He received 94,413 votes and defeated Rana Muhammad Qasim Noon.

In 2014, he was denotified as member of the National Assembly after he was disqualified to continue in office because of fake degree case.

References

Living people
Pakistan Muslim League (N) MNAs
Pakistan Muslim League (Q) MNAs
Pakistani MNAs 2013–2018
Pakistani MNAs 2008–2013
Year of birth missing (living people)